Paul Mansfield Herbert Arnold (November 2, 1903 – May 1979), nicknamed "Sonny", was an American Negro league outfielder in the 1920s and 1930s.

A native of Hopewell, New Jersey, Arnold made his Negro leagues debut in 1926 with the Hilldale Club. He went on to play with several teams, and was selected to represent the Newark Dodgers in the 1935 East–West All-Star Game. Arnold finished his career in 1936 with the New York Cubans. He died in Hopewell in 1979 at age 75.

References

External links
 and Baseball-Reference Black Baseball Stats and  Seamheads 

1903 births
1979 deaths
Date of death missing
Brooklyn Royal Giants players
Hilldale Club players
Lincoln Giants players
New York Cubans players
Newark Browns players
Newark Dodgers players
Baseball outfielders
Baseball players from New Jersey
People from Hopewell, New Jersey
20th-century African-American sportspeople